The 1987 Victorian Football League Night Series (also known as the 1987 National Panasonic Cup) was the 19th edition of the VFL Night Series, a Victorian Football League (VFL)-organised Australian rules football tournament between the clubs from the VFL.

It was the first night series event that was run entirely under the control of the VFL since 1978 VFL Night Series, and the first series since the demise of VFL-owned Australian Football Championships (AFC) tournament that included teams from rival state league competitions such as the SANFL, WAFL and elsewhere. It was also the last night series to be partially staged during the home-and-away premiership season, with future tournaments held only during the pre-season.

Teams
All 14 teams that participated in the 1987 VFL season, including the two non-Victorian expansion teams (West Coast and Brisbane) participated in the series.

 Brisbane Bears
 Carlton
 Collingwood
 Essendon
 Fitzroy
 Footscray
 Geelong
 Hawthorn
 Melbourne
 North Melbourne
 Richmond
 St Kilda
 Sydney Swans
 West Coast

Venues

Results
 Click here for source of results

Round 1

Quarter finals
 Note: Fitzroy qualified as a "lucky loser", given they lost their first round match by the lowest margin (11 points) of any losing team

Semi finals

Final

References

History of Australian rules football
Australian rules football competitions in Australia
1987 in Australian rules football